The Budd Rail Diesel Car, RDC, Budd car or Buddliner is a self-propelled diesel multiple unit (DMU) railcar. Between 1949 and 1962, 398 RDCs were built by the Budd Company of Philadelphia, Pennsylvania, United States. The cars were primarily adopted for passenger service in rural areas with low traffic density or in short-haul commuter service, and were less expensive to operate in this context than a traditional diesel locomotive-drawn train with coaches. The cars could be used singly or coupled together in train sets and controlled from the cab of the front unit. The RDC was one of the few DMU trains to achieve commercial success in North America. RDC trains were an early example of self-contained diesel multiple unit trains, an arrangement now in common use by railways all over the world.

Budd RDCs were sold to operators in North America, South America, Asia, and Australia. They saw extensive use in the Northeast United States, both on branch lines and in commuter service. As passenger service declined in the United States the RDC was often the last surviving conveyor of passengers on a particular route. Most RDCs were retired by the 1980s. In Canada, RDCs have remained in continuous use since their introduction in the 1950s. The RDC inspired several derivatives, including the unsuccessful Budd SPV-2000.

Background

The self-propelled railcar was not a new concept in North American railroading. Beginning in the 1880s railroads experimented with steam-powered railcars on branch lines, where the costs of operating a conventional steam locomotive-hauled set of cars was prohibitive. These cars failed for several reasons: the boiler and engine were too heavy, water and fuel took up too much space, and high maintenance costs eliminated whatever advantage was gained from reducing labor costs. In the 1900s steam railcars gave way to gasoline, led by the McKeen Motor Car Company, which produced 152 between 1905 and 1917. The J. G. Brill Company sold over 300 railbuses in the 1920s. Newcomer Electro-Motive Corporation, working with the Winton Motor Carriage Company, dominated the market at the end of the 1920s but had exited it completely by 1932 as the Great Depression gutted rail traffic.

The Budd Company entered the market in 1932, just as EMC exited. Up to that time Budd was primarily an automotive parts subcontractor, but had pioneered methods for working with stainless steel, including the technique of shot welding to join pieces of stainless steel. This permitted the construction of cars which were both light and strong. Budd partnered with Michelin to construct several rubber-tyred stainless steel rail cars powered by gasoline and diesel engines. These saw service with the Reading Company, Pennsylvania Railroad, and Texas and Pacific Railway. The cars were underpowered, the tires proved prone to blowouts and derailments, and the cars were unsuccessful.

Budd revived its railcar concept after diesel engines with a suitable combination of power and weight became available in 1938, although with more conventional steel wheels. In 1941 Budd built the Prospector for the Denver and Rio Grande Western Railroad. This was a two-car diesel multiple unit. Each car had a pair of  diesel engines and was capable of independent operation. The cars were constructed of stainless steel and included a mix of coach and sleeping accommodations. The design was popular with the public but undone by the difficult operating conditions on the D&RGW. It was withdrawn in July 1942, apparently another failure. However, several technical advances during the Second World War encouraged Budd to try again.

Design
During the years of the Second World War, there were improvements in the lightweight Detroit Diesel engines and, just as importantly, the hydraulic torque converter. Budd, which by then had produced more than 2,500 streamlined cars for various railroads, took a standard  coach design and added a pair of  6-cylinder Detroit Diesel Series 110 engines. Each drove an axle through a hydraulic torque converter derived from the M46 Patton tank, for a 1A-A1 wheel arrangement. The control systems allowed the cars to operate singly, or in multiple. The result was the RDC-1, which made its public debut at Chicago's Union Station on September 19, 1949.

Variants

Budd manufactured five basic variants of the RDC:
 The RDC-1: an  all-passenger coach seating 90 passengers. It weighed  empty.
 The RDC-2: an  baggage and passenger coach configuration (combine) seating 70 passengers. It weighed  empty.
 The RDC-3: an  variant with a railway post office, a baggage compartment and 48 passenger seats. It weighed  empty.
 The RDC-4: a  variant with only the railway post office and baggage area. It weighed  empty.
 The RDC-9: an  passenger trailer seating 94, a single  engine and no control cab.

Several railroads used the designation "RDC-5": the Canadian Pacific Railway for RDC-2s converted to full-coach configuration and the Canadian National Railway for RDC-9s it purchased from the Boston and Maine Railroad.

In 1956, Budd introduced a new version of the RDC, with several improvements. They also featured higher-capacity air conditioning and more comfortable seating. The appearance changed slightly as well: the side fluting continued around to the front of the car and the front-facing windows were smaller.

Jet propulsion

In an experiment toward high-speed rail, the New York Central Railroad fitted a pair of General Electric J47 jet engines from a Convair B-36, complete in their twinned nacelle from the bomber's engine installation, atop one of their RDCs and added a shovel nose front (much like a later automotive air dam) to its cab, but extended upwards, covering the entire front end. It was never intended that jet engines propel regular trains. With high-speed trains advancing overseas, particularly the Japanese Shinkansen bullet trains, American railroads were under pressure from the federal government to catch up. The test runs and subsequent American rail speed record set on July 23, 1966, provided valuable data on the interaction between flanged wheels and rail at high speeds, as well as stress on wheel bearings and track infrastructure.

At the same time the test took place, the Central announced plans to discontinue most of its long-distance trains, including the renowned 20th Century Limited. Trains editor David P. Morgan observed that "...[the New York] Central will never quite convince anyone that the RDC's jet exploit was more a scientific feat than a calculated circus to take the curse off the Centurys funeral notice." Historian Chuck Crouse expressed skepticism in 1990 about the test's usefulness: "What, if anything, did the tests prove is anyone's guess."

Derivatives

In 1956, the New York, New Haven and Hartford Railroad ordered a custom-built, six-car train set they named the Roger Williams,
based on the RDC design. It consisted of two single-ended cab units and four intermediate cars to make a complete train. The units were fitted with third-rail shoes, electric traction motors, and associated gear for operation into Grand Central Terminal, though this was short-lived. In the New Haven's later years, the set was broken up, and used with regular New Haven RDCs, and by Amtrak into the 1980s.

In 1961, five cars were built under license in Australia for the Department of Railways New South Wales. They were shorter and narrower than the North American models.

In the late 1970s Budd sought to replace the aging RDCs with a new design, the SPV-2000. The body shell was based on an Amfleet coach, not the RDC. The design was beset with mechanical problems, and Budd sold only 30 cars.

In 1966,  Tokyu Car built 31 DR2700 series cars for the Taiwan Railway Administration. Tokyu got a licence from the Budd Company and the bodywork of the DR2700 series was based on the RDC. There were 25 powered driving cars (each with a Cummins diesel engine producing ) and 6 trailers. They were withdrawn from regular service in 2014 while several powered driving cars were still active for special trains.

From 1982 to 1984 Tokyu Car built 45 of a heavily specialized, meter-gauge RDC design for the Taiwan Railway Administration under license from Budd. Designated the DR2800 series, the units are organized into 15 permanently-coupled three-car sets (30 powered driving cars and 15 trailers). Like other RDC trainsets before them, each cab unit only has a cab at one end and two cab units bracket a trailer in a standard set. Unlike other RDC sets, however, the trailer's diesel engine is used exclusively to provide head-end power for the entire three-car set, while the engines in the driver cars are used for propulsion. To prevent dependency on the trailer's engine for cooling, the cooling fans of the driver cars are driven hydraulically instead of electrically. All 15 sets are still in service as of 2022.

History

United States

The vast majority of RDCs were owned and operated by railroads in the United States. They could be found on branch lines, short-haul intercity routes, commuter routes, and even long-distance trains. The Western Pacific Railroad used a pair of RDC-2s to operate the Zephyrette, a supplement to the California Zephyr. The two cars ran between Oakland, California and Salt Lake City, Utah, three days a week. Examples of shorter intercity services were the Chicago, Rock Island and Pacific Railroad's Memphis, Tennessee–Amarillo, Texas Choctaw Rocket and the Baltimore and Ohio Railroad's Daylight Speedliner. The latter ran between Pittsburgh and Philadelphia and included full dining service. A notable example of the RDC's flexibility occurred on the Pennsylvania-Reading Seashore Lines, where a single train would depart Camden, New Jersey and split into multiple trains to serve different destinations on the Atlantic coast.

The largest RDC fleets were in the Northeast United States. The New York, New Haven and Hartford Railroad (New Haven) acquired 40 RDCs, which it called "Shoreliners", in 1952–53. By 1955 these accounted for 65% of the New Haven's passenger routes. This achievement was eclipsed by the Boston and Maine Railroad, whose fleet grew to 108 by 1958. The B&M's RDCs operated 90% of the company's passenger routes, including its extensive commuter operations around Boston, Massachusetts.

The results in commuter service outside the B&M were mixed. Budd had not designed the RDC for commuter service and discouraged operators from using it to haul coaches. The Long Island Rail Road and Chicago and North Western Railway, which had extensive networks in Long Island and Chicago, respectively, evaluated the RDC but made few orders. Conversely, the Reading Company's 12 RDC-1s lasted on the Philadelphia–Reading and Philadelphia–Bethlehem routes well into the SEPTA era.

For several railroads the RDCs, because of their low overall cost and operational flexibility, were the last passenger trains in operation. Examples include the Duluth, Missabe, and Iron Range Railway, the Duluth, South Shore and Atlantic Railway, the Lehigh Valley Railroad, and the Northwestern Pacific Railroad, where RDC service survived until the formation of Amtrak in 1971.

Many RDCs remained in service throughout the 1970s and 1980s. Amtrak acquired 24 (including three from the Roger Williams), mostly for use in Connecticut. The Massachusetts Bay Transportation Authority (MBTA) acquired the B&M's fleet and continued operating them until 1985. The Alaska Railroad acquired five RDCs, three from SEPTA and two from Amtrak between 1984 and 1986. These were all sold or out of service by 2009. Trinity Railway Express acquired thirteen RDCs from Via Rail in 1993 for use on commuter service between Dallas and Fort Worth, Texas. The Denton County Transportation Authority leased several for A-train service pending the arrival of new Stadler GTW 2/6s diesel multiple units.

Despite their advanced age, a market for Budd RDCs has continued. Oregonian transit authority TriMet purchased and refurbished two RDCs in 2009 to provide backup for its commuter rail service, WES, following reliability issues with the primary DMUs for that service, which had been purpose-built by Colorado Railcar. In 2017, a Vermont company, AllEarth Rail, bought twelve 1959 Budd cars from Dallas Area Rapid Transit for $5 million. The cars had previously been owned by Via Rail Canada, which also bid on the lot. AllEarth said it planned to use the cars for commuter rail service in Vermont, possibly starting with a Burlington-to-Montpelier route. TriMet subsequently purchased two of these cars from AllEarth later the same year, in addition to its existing two, and stated they would enter WES service in 2021.

Canada

Both the Canadian National Railway (CN) and Canadian Pacific Railway (CP) purchased RDCs. The Canadian National purchased 25 cars outright, and acquired many more second-hand from the Boston and Maine Railroad. These cars, which CN called Railiners, were used primarily on secondary passenger routes. CP purchased 53 cars. The first one ran on November 9, 1954, between Detroit and Toronto. It was the first stainless-steel passenger train to operate in Canada. CP used the RDCs, which it called Dayliners, throughout its system. CP also made extensive use of them on commuter trains around Montreal and Toronto. Via Rail inherited many of these cars when it took over CN and CP passenger services in 1978. Via continues to use RDCs on the Sudbury–White River train in Ontario.

Another Canadian purchaser of RDCs was the Pacific Great Eastern Railway, which operated passenger service between North Vancouver and Prince George. RDCs continued to operate on this route until all passenger service ended under BC Rail, PGE's successor, in 2002.

Refurbished RDCs were considered for Blue22, a rail service between Toronto Union Station and Pearson Airport, by 2010. The service, which was transferred to Metrolinx ownership and opened in 2015 as the Union Pearson Express, ultimately used new Nippon Sharyo DMU trains instead.

Australia

In 1951, the Budd Company exported three standard RDC-1 railcars to Australia, which Budd engineer Joseph F. Grosser accompanied. Designated the CB class, they ran on the standard gauge Commonwealth Railways lines in the sparsely populated north of South Australia not served by the South Australian Railways. They operated between Port Pirie, Woomera, Tarcoola, Marree and Whyalla.

In July 1975, when the Commonwealth Railways were succeeded by the Australian National Railways Commission (successively branded as ANR, Australian National and AN), they were withdrawn from service and stored. In 1986, however, they were reinstated on the Iron Triangle Limited service from Adelaide to Whyalla and the Silver City Limited service from Broken Hill. The cars were withdrawn from service in 1990. , CB1 was preserved at the National Railway Museum, Port Adelaide; CB2 and CB3 were privately owned.

In 1961, Commonwealth Engineering built five RDC-1 derivative cars in Australia under licence for the New South Wales railways department. Four were self-propelled and one was a trailer car. The trailer car was built with a buffet/snack bar in one end. The cars worked the South Coast Daylight Express between Sydney and Bomaderry. Age and mechanical problems led the cars' conversion to locomotive-hauled coaches; beginning in 1982; the last self-propelled run occurred in 1986.

Brazil

RFFSA (Brazilian Federal Railways) purchased four RDC-1s and two RDC-2s in 1958. These were  gauge but otherwise standard configuration. RFFSA ordered 23 more cars in 1962–1963. Four of these were  gauge RDC-1s. The other 19 were  gauge and varied considerably from the standard RDC-1 design. The car body was based on the Pioneer III coach. Internal seating was 48 with a small buffet area or 56 in an all-coach configuration. Several RDCs remain active on the Serra Verde Express tourist train.

Cuba

In the 1950s, both major railway companies in Cuba purchased RDCs. Consolidated Railways of Cuba (Ferrocarriles Consolidados de Cuba) ordered 11 RDC-1s and 5 RDC-2s in 1950. These operated either singly or in multiple units of up to three cars. The Western Railways of Cuba (Ferrocarriles Occidentales de Cuba) ordered four RDC-1s and six RDC-3s in 1956–57. The cars remained in use after the Cuban Revolution with the Ferrocarriles de Cuba and operated into the 1980s.  At least one Cuban RDC-1 still existed in 2017, stripped of all mechanical components and serving as a passenger coach.

Saudi Arabia

The Arabian American Oil Company constructed a standard gauge railway in cooperation with the Saudi government. The company ordered three RDC-2s in 1951, supplemented by a fourth in 1958. The cars operated on various routes originating in Dammam. All were converted to unpowered trailers by 1965.

Original owners
Budd constructed 398 RDCs between 1949 and 1962. The table below does not include the six cars which comprised the Roger Williams, nor derivative designs built under license.

Preservation
Numerous RDCs have been preserved on tourist lines and in museums. Holders include:

 Alberta Central Railway Museum
 Bedford Depot
 B&O Railroad Museum
 Bellefonte Historical Railroad Society
 Cape May Seashore Lines
 Conway Scenic Railroad
 Danbury Railway Museum
 Hobo Railroad
 Idaho Northern and Pacific Railroad
 Illinois Railway Museum
 Lehigh Gorge Scenic Railway
 National Railway Museum [of Australia]
 New Hope Valley Railway
 North Shore Scenic Railroad
 Orford Express
 Port of Tillamook Bay Railroad
 Railroad Museum of New England
 Railroad Museum of Pennsylvania
 Rapido Trains
 Reading, Blue Mountain and Northern
 Reading Railroad Heritage Museum
 Waterloo Central Railway
 West Coast Railway Association

See also
 X 2051 , a French-built derivative prototype
 South Australian Railways Bluebird railcar
 V/Line VLocity, currently built by Bombardier Australia
 Taiwan Railway DR2700 series

Notes

References

Select bibliography

Further reading

External links

 BuddRDC.com
 As litorinas Budd no Brasil 

Budd multiple units
Railcars of the United States
Rolling stock of Canada
Railway locomotives introduced in 1949